Natalya Krupskaya (born 1972) is a retired Russian swimmer who won a gold medal in the 4×100 m medley relay at the 1991 European Aquatics Championships. During her career she won three national titles (1988, 1989 and 1991) and set one national record (1991) in the 200 m backstroke.

She started swimming in 1980 and by 1987 was a member of the Soviet team. After retirement she worked as a swimming coach in her native Novokuznetsk.

References

1972 births
Living people
Russian female swimmers
Female backstroke swimmers
Soviet female swimmers
European Aquatics Championships medalists in swimming
People from Novokuznetsk
Sportspeople from Kemerovo Oblast